"Little Shocks" is a song by English indie rock band Kaiser Chiefs, taken from their fourth studio album The Future Is Medieval (2011). The song was written by Nick Hodgson, Ricky Wilson, Simon Rix, Nick Baines, and Andrew "Whitey" White. It was produced by Tony Visconti. It peaked at number 179 on the UK Singles Chart.

Music video
A music video to accompany the release of "Little Shocks" was first released onto YouTube on 28 June 2011. It is three minutes and fifty-two seconds long, and it features electrically based physics equipment, such as a Tesla coil behind the band, and Ricky Wilson in a Faraday cage.

Track listing

Chart performance

References 

2011 singles
Kaiser Chiefs songs
Song recordings produced by Tony Visconti
Songs written by Nick Hodgson
Songs written by Ricky Wilson (British musician)
Songs written by Simon Rix
Songs written by Andrew White (musician)
Songs written by Nick "Peanut" Baines
2011 songs
Polydor Records singles